This List of Saxifragaceae genera includes about 30 genera placed within the family Saxifragaceae s.s..

 Astilbe – false goat's-beards
 Astilboides
 Bensoniella – Oregon bensoniella
 Bergenia
 Bolandra – false coolworts
 Boykinia – brookfoams (including Telesonix Raf.)
 Chrysosplenium – golden-saxifrages
 Conimitella Rydb.
 Darmera – Indian rhubarb (synonym Peltiphyllum)
 Elmera Rydb.
 Hemieva Raf.
 Heterisia
 Heuchera – Coral bells
 Hirculus
 Hydatica
 Jepsonia
 Leptarrhena R.Br.
 Leptasea
 Limnobotrya
 Lithophragma – woodlandstars
 Micranthes Haw.
 Mitella – miterworts
 Mukdenia – mukdenias
 Neoboykinia
 Oreotrys
 Oresitrophe
 Ozomelis
 Pectiantia
 Peltoboykinia
 Rodgersia
 Saniculiphyllum
 Saxifraga – Saxifrages (including Saxifragella Engl.)
 Saxifragodes
 Saxifragopsis Small (sometimes included in Saxifraga)
 Spatularia
 Steiranisia
 Suksdorfia Gray (including  Hieronymusia)
 Sullivantia Torr. & Gray ex Gray – coolworts
 Tanakaea
 Tellima – Fringecups
 Therofon
 Tiarella – foamflowers
 Tolmiea – Piggyback plant

The family does not include the genus Sassafras, despite the possibly related Latin etymology of the names.

References

Bibliography 

 
 
 
 
 

 
Lists of plant genera (alphabetic)